The Great Sand Hills, also spelt Great Sandhills, are sand dunes in the south-west region of the Canadian province of Saskatchewan. The sands that make up the dunes are made up of very finely ground sand called rock flour that were deposited near the end of the last ice age. The region around the sand hills is often windy and, as a result, the wind blows the fine sands around creating an ever-changing landscape.

Sceptre is home to the Great Sandhills Museum & Interpretive Centre.

Formation 
The Great Sand Hills were created over 12,000 years ago near the end of the last ice age as the Wisconsin ice sheet retreated. At that time, the landscape of southern Saskatchewan was much different than it is today as there were retreating glaciers and several proglacial lakes. The area of the Great Sand Hills, and nearby Elbow Sand Hills at the headwaters of the Qu'Appelle River in Douglas Provincial Park, was covered by Glacial Lake Bursary. The South Saskatchewan Spillway flowed from the lake and as the glaciers disappeared and the waters began to dry up, sand deltas built up causing the South Saskatchewan Spillway to change course, thereby carving out the South Saskatchewan River Valley. Glacial Lake Bursary dried up exposing the sand deltas, which are the sand hills that exist today.

Flora and fauna 
Animals found around the hills include the antelope, mule deer, pronghorn, fox, coyote, white-tailed deer, badger, weasel, porcupine, and the rare Ord's kangaroo rat. Local birds include the sharp-tailed grouse, white pelican, merlin, peregrine falcon, golden eagle, burrowing owl, mourning dove, and sandhill crane. Vegetation around the hills is limited due to the dry conditions and poor soil but includes prairie grasses, sagebrush, and small clumps of trees such as aspen and willow.

See also 
List of protected areas of Saskatchewan
Geology of Saskatchewan
Geography of Saskatchewan
Tourism in Saskatchewan

References

External links 

Why are there sand dunes in the middle of Saskatchewan?

Dunes of Canada
Hills of Saskatchewan
Landforms of Saskatchewan
Protected areas of Saskatchewan
Clinworth No. 230, Saskatchewan